Kushtia is a city in the Khulna Division of southwestern  Bangladesh. Kushtia is the second largest municipality in Bangladesh and the eleventh largest city in the country. The second largest city in Khulna division. It is one of the commercial cities. It serves as the headquarters of Kushtia Sadar Upazila and Kushtia District.

Education
According to Banglapedia, Dinmani Secondary School, founded in 1930, Kushtia Zilla School (1960), Kumarkhali M N High School and Mohini Mohan High School (1944) are notable secondary schools.

References

External links

Cities in Bangladesh
Populated places in Khulna Division